Babrala railway station (station code BBA) is a small railway station located in Sambhal district in the Indian state of Uttar Pradesh. Babrala railway station belongs to Northern Railway, Moradabad. Nearby stations are Rajghat Narora and Bhakrauli and Moradabad railway station is a major station.

Major trains 
 Aligarh–Moradabad Passenger 
 Bandikui–Bareilly Passenger 
 Bandikui–Rishikesh Passenger 
 Bareilly–Bandikui Passenger
 Aligarh–Bareilly Passenger 
 Farrukhabad–Bareilly Passenger
 Link Express
 Mumbai LLT Weekly Express (Bareilly–Babrala–Mumbai)

See also

 Northern Railway zone
 Babrala

References 

Railway stations in Agra district